Terror Hotel (Chinese: 恐怖旅馆) is a 2012 Chinese horror film directed by Laizhi Zheng.

References

Chinese horror films
2012 horror films
2012 films